Amblyptilia scutellaris is a moth of the family Pterophoridae that is known from Colombia.

References

Amblyptilia
Moths described in 1875
Endemic fauna of Colombia
Moths of South America
Taxa named by Alois Friedrich Rogenhofer